Philippe Aubert may refer to:
Philippe Aubert (judoka) (born 1943), Swiss judoka
Philippe Aubert (hurdler) (born 1957), French hurdler